Datong Bridge Station is an underground metro station of Line 2 and Line 3 in Ningbo, Zhejiang, China. It situates on the crossing of Qingyun Road and Jintang Road. Construction of the station starts in late 2010 and opened to service in September 26, 2015. In June 2019, Datong Bridge Station became a transfer station between Line 2 and Line 3.

Exits 
Datong Bridge Station has 4 exits.

References 

Railway stations in Zhejiang
Railway stations in China opened in 2015
Ningbo Rail Transit stations